Sven-Olof Lundgren (3 November 1908 – 26 March 1946) was a Swedish ski jumper. He participated at the 1928 Winter Olympics in St. Moritz, where he placed fifth.

References

External links

1908 births
1946 deaths
People from Örnsköldsvik Municipality
Swedish male ski jumpers
Olympic ski jumpers of Sweden
Ski jumpers at the 1928 Winter Olympics
Sportspeople from Västernorrland County